William Higgins (12 December 1850 – 8 April 1926) was an English cricketer. He played six first-class matches for Marylebone Cricket Club between 1870 and 1873.

References

External links
 

1850 births
1926 deaths
English cricketers
Marylebone Cricket Club cricketers
People from Westminster
Cricketers from Greater London
Gentlemen of Marylebone Cricket Club cricketers
Gentlemen of England cricketers